QF 4 inch gun can refer to:

QF 4 inch naval gun Mk I - III
QF 4 inch Mk V naval gun
QF 4 inch naval gun Mk IV, XII, XXII
QF 4 inch Mk XVI naval gun
QF 4 inch Mk XIX naval gun
QF 4 inch naval gun Mk XXIII

100 mm artillery